Jim L. Holt (born January 17, 1965) is an American Baptist minister and a conservative Republican politician from Springdale in northwestern Arkansas.

Background
Holt was born in Camden in Ouachita County, southern Arkansas. He joined the military in 1987 and served in the U.S. Army Joint Intelligence Operations at the National Security Agency. His website notes he "was involved in highly classified operations during the Cold War, the ousting of Manuel Noriega from Panama, and Operation Desert Storm". He is a "small business owner/operator and a part-time  counselor". In 1996, Holt became an ordained Southern Baptist minister. He and his wife, the former Bobye Barenberg, originally of Rogers, Arkansas, have ten children.

Political career
Holt was first elected to the Arkansas House of Representatives in the 2000 general election.  He served in the House from 2001 to 2003, during which time, he sponsored a bill designed to prohibit the teaching of the theory of evolution in Arkansas public schools (see Evolution below). Holt was elected to the Arkansas Senate in the 2002 general election and served there until December 31, 2006.

In 2004, Holt was the Republican nominee for the U. S. Senate. He was defeated by the Democrat Blanche Lincoln, 55–44 percent.

In 2006, Holt was the Republican nominee for lieutenant governor and was defeated by Democrat Bill Halter, 57–42 percent.

In 2010, Holt was a candidate in the Republican primary for U.S. Senate and was defeated by Republican John Boozman, 53–17 percent, with the remaining percent divided among six other GOP candidates. Boozman in turn unseated Lincoln, against whom Holt had run six years earlier.

Political positions

Evolution
Holt co-sponsored Arkansas House Bill 2548 in 2001, which would have required public schools to identify evolution as an unproven theory, and which would have prohibited the use of public funds for the promotion of evolution-related information as fact. The bill was sponsored by several other House members, including Representative Jack Critcher, who later became the Democratic President Pro Tempore of the Arkansas Senate. The measure fell six votes short of passage.  Holt was criticized in July 2006 by Don Michael, an opinion writer for the Fayetteville Northwest Arkansas Times, for having invited in April 2001 the creationist Kent Hovind to speak on behalf of the bill before a House committee.

Abortion
Holt has also attempted to halt or restrict abortion. He has called for the overturning of Roe v. Wade as an example of "judicial tyranny plaguing our nation today. The laws in all fifty states were overturned, and the consent of the governed as the basis for all just governmental power was thrown out. I will not confirm a federal judicial nominee who I believe will vote to uphold Roe vs. Wade."

Healthcare
Holt opposes the healthcare reform measures implemented by the U.S. Congress in March 2010, stating "We don’t need health care 'reform', but remove government from the health sector and let the market decide.

The number of Arkansas residents on Medicare went from 457,808 to 917,474 (from 2013 to 2021). This doubled the number of recipients of government subsidized healthcare.

Opposition to Mike Huckabee
As a legislator, Holt tangled publicly with former Governor Mike Huckabee over immigration. In 2007, Holt opposed Huckabee's unsuccessful effort to make children of illegal immigrants eligible for state-funded scholarships and in-state tuition to Arkansas colleges, a position also adopted in Texas under Republican Governor Rick Perry. Holt defended his position by asking Huckabee if he would allow the same privileges to families of military personnel deployed overseas. Huckabee did not respond.

On January 18, 2008, the Northwest Arkansas Times ran an opinion piece by Holt blasting Huckabee and his supporters. Holt accused Huckabee's followers of not researching what Huckabee's positions are, and supporting him merely because he is a Christian.

References

External links
 

1965 births
Living people
People from Camden, Arkansas
Republican Party Arkansas state senators
American Christian creationists
Republican Party members of the Arkansas House of Representatives
Southern Baptist ministers
People from Springdale, Arkansas
Baptists from Arkansas
Conservatism in the United States